Maunura is a village located 45 km west of Ende, Flores, Indonesia. The population of Maunura is around 5,000 residents.

Populated places in East Nusa Tenggara
Flores Island (Indonesia)